Valentin Lavigne (born 4 June 1994) is a French footballer who plays as a right midfielder for Fleury.

Club career
Lavigne is a youth exponent from Lorient. He made his Ligue 1 debut on 10 August 2014 against AS Monaco, replacing Yann Jouffre after 81 minutes and scoring the winning goal six minutes later. Lorient won 2–1, their first ever away win at Monaco. In January 2016, Lavigne joined Ligue 2 side Stade Lavallois on loan for the remainder of the 2015–16 season. He went on to play eight league matches for the club. For the 2016–2017 season, he was again loaned out, this time to Brest. He was loaned out again for the 2017–18 season, to Paris FC.

In September 2018 Lavigne departed from Lorient and signed for Championnat National club US Concarneau.

In July 2020, Lavigne signed a one-year contract, with the option of a one-year extension, with newly promoted Championnat national club Stade Briochin.

In June 2022, Lavigne moved to Fleury in the fourth tier.

Career statistics

References

External links
 
 
 
 

1994 births
Living people
Sportspeople from Lorient
French footballers
France youth international footballers
Association football midfielders
FC Lorient players
Stade Lavallois players
Stade Brestois 29 players
Paris FC players
US Concarneau players
Stade Briochin players
FC Fleury 91 players
Ligue 1 players
Ligue 2 players
Championnat National players
Championnat National 2 players
Championnat National 3 players
Footballers from Brittany